Chris Murray may refer to:

Chris Murray (ice hockey, born 1974), Canadian ice hockey right winger
Chris Murray (ice hockey, born 1984), American ice hockey defenceman
Chris Murray (musician) (born 1966), Canadian singer-songwriter
Chris Murray (soccer) (born 1985), American soccer player 
Chris Murray (Canadian civil servant), City Manager of Toronto
Chris Murray (weightlifter), British weightlifter
Christopher Murray (actor) (born 1957), American actor
Christopher Murray (swimmer) (born 1978), Bahamian swimmer
Christopher J. L. Murray, American public health scholar
Christopher W. Murray (born 1953), former United States Ambassador to the Republic of the Congo
Christopher M. Murray, chief judge of the Michigan Court of Claims